Francisco "Paco" Sutil Tirado (born 21 December 1984) is a Spanish professional footballer who plays for Martos CD as a left winger.

He spent most of his career with Real Jaén, appearing in exactly 100 Segunda División games over four seasons (six goals scored), with that club, Murcia and Sabadell. In 2010–11 he competed in La Liga, with Real Sociedad.

Football career

Jaén
Born in Jaén, Andalusia, Sutil began his career at hometown club Real Jaén, playing in its reserve team and on loan at amateurs Úbeda CF before making his debut in the first team on 31 August 2002, starting in a 1–2 away loss against CD Linares in the Segunda División B championship. 

He spent six seasons with the main squad, always in that level.

Eibar
In June 2008, Sutil moved to SD Eibar in Segunda División. His debut as a professional took place on 3 September, starting in a 0–1 defeat at CD Castellón for the second round of the Copa del Rey; ten days later he played his first league game, coming on as a half-time substitute for Josu Etxaniz as the team fell 0–2 away to SD Huesca. 

On 21 February 2009, Sutil volleyed the decisive goal in a 2–1 away triumph against Celta de Vigo. He contributed with a further two successful strikes in 37 games, as the campaign ended in relegation.

Real Sociedad
On 29 June 2010, following an eight-goal haul in the following campaign back in division three, Sutil signed a two-year contract with the option of a third for another Basque club, Real Sociedad. His La Liga debut came two months later, as he started in a 1–0 win over Villarreal CF at the Anoeta Stadium. 

On 13 September 2010, Sutil netted his first goal for the Txurri-Urdin, putting them back into the lead in an eventual 2–2 draw at UD Almería. Of his 14 subsequent games over the season only two were starts, and in the final game, at home to Getafe CF, he came on at the interval in place of David Zurutuza and equalised for a 1–1 draw.

Later career
On 1 August 2011, Sutil agreed to a three-year deal with Real Murcia in the second tier. After two years of relative playing time, he joined another team from the same category, CE Sabadell FC, for one season. An internal disciplinary hearing was taken on him in late December, for undisclosed reasons, and having collected only 233 minutes of action for the Catalans, his contract was terminated on 10 January 2014.

After offering his services for a nominal salary at La Hoya Lorca CF to be nearer to his Murcian girlfriend, Sutil returned to Real Jaén on 28 January, making four substitute appearances as the team suffered relegation to the third division. After the appointment of manager Gonzalo Arconada in the 2015 off-season, he was soon deemed surplus to requirements, moving on 2 July the following year to Antequera CF in Tercera División.

References

External links

1984 births
Living people
Footballers from Jaén, Spain
Spanish footballers
Association football wingers
La Liga players
Segunda División players
Segunda División B players
Tercera División players
Real Jaén footballers
SD Eibar footballers
Real Sociedad footballers
Real Murcia players
CE Sabadell FC footballers
Antequera CF footballers
Martos CD footballers